Felicity Kenvyn (known as Lissa Evans) is a British television director, producer, novelist and children's author.

After qualifying as a doctor in 1983, Evans worked in medicine in Newcastle for four years before a brief period in stand-up, beginning with an ensemble review called "Wire Less Wireless" which played in some of the pubs in Newcastle. Evans joined BBC Radio where she was a producer of comedy programmes before migrating to television. She has produced and/or directed such shows as Father Ted (for which she won a BAFTA for best comedy), Room 101, The Kumars at No. 42, TV Heaven, Telly Hell, Crossing the Floor (for which she won an Emmy for best drama) and Have I Got News For You and also served as voice director for the British-Canadian children's television series Don't Eat the Neighbours.

Evans has written six novels for adults: Spencer's List, Odd One Out, Their Finest Hour and a Half (now filmed as Their Finest) Crooked Heart (which with Their Finest Hour and a Half was long-listed for the Baileys Women's Prize for Fiction), Old Baggage  and V for Victory.

For children, she has written Small Change For Stuart, shortlisted for the 2011 Costa Award for Children's fiction, the 2012 Carnegie Medal, and the 2012 Branford Boase Award. Small Change for Stuart was published in the United States as Horten's Miraculous Mechanisms, and the sequel, Big Change for Stuart (Horten's Incredible Illusions in the U.S.) was published in 2012. Another book for children, Wed Wabbit, was published in 2017 and shortlisted for the 2017 Costa Book Awards and the 2018 Carnegie Medal.

Bibliography 

For adults
 Spencer's List (2003)
 Odd One Out (2005)
 Their Finest Hour and a Half (2009)
 Crooked Heart (2014)
 Old Baggage (2018)
 V for Victory (2020)

For children
 Smudger the Dog Saves Christmas (2010)
 Small Change for Stuart (2011)
 Big Change for Stuart (2012)
 Wed Wabbit (2017)

References

External links
 

1950s births
Year of birth missing (living people)
Living people
British television directors
English television producers
21st-century British novelists
British women novelists
21st-century pseudonymous writers
Pseudonymous women writers
British women television producers
British television producers
British women television directors
British voice directors